is a Japanese wheelchair tennis player. He represented Japan at the 2012 Summer Paralympics in quad singles and quad doubles and at the 2016 Summer Paralympics in quad singles and quad doubles. His doubles partner both years was Shota Kawano. At the 2020 Summer Paralympics, he and Koji Sugeno won bronze medals for Japan in the quad doubles event. Moroishi also finished 9th in the quad singles event. He was born in Konan and resides in Kakamigahara.

References

External links 
 
 

1967 births
Living people
Japanese male tennis players
Wheelchair tennis players
Paralympic wheelchair tennis players of Japan
Paralympic bronze medalists for Japan
Paralympic medalists in wheelchair tennis
Medalists at the 2020 Summer Paralympics
Wheelchair tennis players at the 2012 Summer Paralympics
Wheelchair tennis players at the 2016 Summer Paralympics
Wheelchair tennis players at the 2020 Summer Paralympics
20th-century Japanese people
21st-century Japanese people